Edward Stanley Roberts (6 May 1890 – September 1964) was an English first-class cricketer who played three matches for Worcestershire in 1925. He found no success in any of these games.

References
Edward Roberts from CricketArchive

English cricketers
Worcestershire cricketers
1890 births
1964 deaths
Sportspeople from Oswestry